Karl Sebastien Dykhuis (born July 8, 1972) is a Canadian former professional ice hockey defenceman who played 12 seasons in the National Hockey League (NHL) for the Chicago Blackhawks, Philadelphia Flyers, Tampa Bay Lightning and Montreal Canadiens.

As a youth, he played in the 1985 and 1986 Quebec International Pee-Wee Hockey Tournaments with a minor ice hockey team from Sept-Îles, Quebec.

During the 2004–05 NHL lockout Dykhuis played for the Amsterdam Bulldogs Hockey Club in The Netherlands.

Awards and achievements
 QMJHL All-Rookie Team (1989)
 QMJHL Defensive Rookie of the Year (1989)
 QMJHL First All-Star Team (1990)
 1991 World Junior U20 Gold Medalist

Transactions
Feb. 16 1995: Traded to Philadelphia Flyers by Chicago Blackhawks for Bob Wilkie and Philadelphia's fifth round choice (Kyle Calder) in 1997 Entry Draft
Aug. 20 1997: Traded to Tampa Bay Lightning by Philadelphia Flyers with Mikael Renberg for Philadelphia's first round choices (previously acquired) in 1998 (Simon Gagne), 1999: (Maxime Ouellet), 2000 (Justin Williams) and 2001 (later traded to Ottawa - Ottawa selected Tim Gleason) Entry Drafts
Dec. 28, 1998: Traded to Philadelphia Flyers by Tampa Bay Lightning for Petr Svoboda
 Oct. 20, 1999: Traded to Montreal Canadiens by Philadelphia Flyers for cash
 Jan. 3, 2005: Signed as a free agent by Amsterdam (Netherlands)
 Aug. 25, 2005: Signed as a free agent by Mannheim (Germany)

Career statistics

Regular season and playoffs

International

References

External links
 

1972 births
Adler Mannheim players
Amsterdam Bulldogs players
Canadian expatriate ice hockey players in Austria
Canadian ice hockey defencemen
Canadian people of Dutch descent
Chicago Blackhawks draft picks
Chicago Blackhawks players
Hamilton Bulldogs (AHL) players
Hershey Bears players
Hull Olympiques players
Ice hockey people from Quebec
Indianapolis Ice players
Living people
Longueuil Collège Français (QMJHL) players
Montreal Canadiens players
National Hockey League first-round draft picks
People from Sept-Îles, Quebec
Philadelphia Flyers players
Tampa Bay Lightning players
Verdun Collège Français players
Canadian expatriate ice hockey players in the Netherlands
Canadian expatriate ice hockey players in Germany
Canadian expatriate ice hockey players in the United States